Scugog/Charlies Landing Water Aerodrome  is located adjacent on Lake Scugog  east southeast of Scugog, Ontario, Canada.

References

Airports in the Regional Municipality of Durham
Registered aerodromes in Ontario
Seaplane bases in Ontario